Mesa Verde Administrative District is a set of six National Park Service buildings within Mesa Verde National Park, constructed between 1921 and 1927 in the Pueblo Revival style.  Located on Chapin Mesa, these were the structures built by the Park Service to use culturally relevant architectural traditions in park architecture.  The buildings were declared a National Historic Landmark District in 1987.

History
Mesa Verde National Park was founded in 1906 to preserve a series of spectacular Ancestral Puebloan ruins and archaeological sites in southwestern Colorado.  The National Park Service was founded in 1916 to manage the nation's growing inventory of national parks.  It did not begin significant oversight of Mesa Verde until 1921, when archaeologist Jesse Nussbaum took over its administration.  During his tenure (which lasted until 1931), the buildings described below were built on Chapin Mesa to support the administration of the park.

The buildings share a common architectural vocabulary, which includes the use of sandstone, some of which was taken from some of the park's prehistoric structures.  The walls typically have a battered exterior, and are covered by a roof supported by vigas.  Woodwork in the buildings is worked to appear as if it had been fashioned using pioneer tools, and the interior walls are plastered.

The landmark buildings include:
National Park Headquarters, 1923
Chapin Mesa Museum, 1923–24
Post Office, 1923
Ranger Dormitory, 1925
Superintendents Residence, 1921
Community Building, 1927

Most of these buildings have undergone subsequent alteration and expansion, as the needs of the park administration have grown and changed.  The buildings are clustered in a roughly  area on Chapin Mesa.

References

External links

Architecture in the Parks: A National Historic Landmark Theme Study: Mesa Verde Administrative District, by Laura Soullière Harrison, at National Park Service.

Mesa Verde National Park
National Register of Historic Places in Montezuma County, Colorado
National Register of Historic Places in national parks
National Historic Landmarks in Colorado
National Historic Landmark Districts
Native American history of Colorado
Historic districts on the National Register of Historic Places in Colorado
Pueblo Revival architecture in Colorado
Buildings and structures in Montezuma County, Colorado
Park buildings and structures on the National Register of Historic Places in Colorado